Gretchen Magers was the defending champion but lost in the semifinals to Laura Gildemeister.

Gildemeister won in the final 6–4, 6–3 against Marianne Werdel.

Seeds
A champion seed is indicated in bold text while text in italics indicates the round in which that seed was eliminated. The top eight seeds received a bye to the second round.

  Gretchen Magers (semifinals)
  Halle Cioffi (second round)
  Ann Grossman (third round)
  Betsy Nagelsen (second round)
  Ann Henricksson (quarterfinals)
  Carrie Cunningham (second round)
  Beverly Bowes (third round)
  Laura Gildemeister (champion)
  Louise Allen (third round)
  Eva Krapl (second round)
  Stacey Martin (quarterfinals)
  Beth Herr (third round)
  Hu Na (third round)
  Marianne Werdel (final)
  Kim Kessaris (second round)
  Michelle Jaggard (second round)

Draw

Finals

Top half

Section 1

Section 2

Bottom half

Section 3

Section 4

External links
 1989 OTB Open Draw

Women's Singles
Singles